José Rafael Meza Ivancovich (6 July 1920 – 15 July 1988) was a Costa Rican footballer who represented the Costa Rica national football team between 1941 and 1951, scoring eleven goals in seven games.

Career statistics

International

International goals
Scores and results list Costa Rica's goal tally first, score column indicates score after each Costa Rica goal.

References

1920 births
1988 deaths
Costa Rican footballers
Costa Rican football managers
Costa Rica international footballers
Association football forwards
C.S. Cartaginés players
Estudiantes de La Plata footballers
Atlante F.C. footballers
C.S. Herediano footballers
C.S. Herediano managers
Costa Rican expatriate footballers
Costa Rican expatriate football managers
Costa Rican expatriate sportspeople in Mexico
Costa Rican expatriate sportspeople in Colombia
Costa Rican expatriate sportspeople in Honduras
Expatriate footballers in Mexico
Expatriate footballers in Argentina
Expatriate footballers in Colombia
Expatriate footballers in Honduras
Expatriate football managers in Mexico
Expatriate football managers in Honduras